is a professional race car driver.

Racing Record

24 Hours of Le Mans results

Complete Formula Nippon results 
(key) (Races in bold indicate pole position) (Races in italics indicate fastest lap)

References 

1972 births
Living people
Japanese racing drivers
Japanese Touring Car Championship drivers
Japanese Formula 3 Championship drivers
24 Hours of Le Mans drivers
Super GT drivers

Toyota Gazoo Racing drivers
Nürburgring 24 Hours drivers
Team LeMans drivers
TOM'S drivers
Kondō Racing drivers
Dandelion Racing drivers
Team Aguri drivers